The Canton of Mont-Saint-Aignan is a canton situated in the Seine-Maritime département and in the Normandy region of northern France.

Geography 
An area of light industry, forestry and manufacturing situated immediately northwest of Rouen in the arrondissement of Rouen. The altitude varies from 4m (Déville-lès-Rouen) to 171m (Mont-Saint-Aignan) with an average altitude of 108m.

The Canton of Mont-Saint-Aignan comprises the following 2 communes:
Déville-lès-Rouen
Mont-Saint-Aignan

Population

See also 
 Arrondissements of the Seine-Maritime department
 Cantons of the Seine-Maritime department
 Communes of the Seine-Maritime department

References

Mont-Saint-Aignan